Intelsat 1R (formerly PAS-1R) is a communications satellite owned by Intelsat located at 50° West of longitude, serving Americas, the Caribbean, Europe and Africa. The satellite was replaced by Intelsat 14 at 45° West in 2010 and moved to 50° West, where it was finally replaced by Intelsat 29e.

References 

Satellites using the BSS-702 bus
Intelsat satellites
Communications satellites in geostationary orbit
Satellite television
Spacecraft launched in 2000